Shadow Mountain Trail is a trail  long on the east side of Shadow Mountain Lake, near Grand Lake, Colorado. It is also known as, or is associated with, Echo Mountain Trail,  Lookout Mountain Trail and Pine Ridge Trail. The trail was rebuilt in 1930 by the National Park Service; trail design reflects NPS Naturalistic Design of the 1920s to 1940s.

It was listed on the National Register of Historic Places in 2008. The listing included  with one contributing structure.

References

Park buildings and structures on the National Register of Historic Places in Colorado
Late 19th and Early 20th Century American Movements architecture
Buildings and structures completed in 1930
Buildings and structures in Grand County, Colorado
National Register of Historic Places in Grand County, Colorado
National Register of Historic Places in Rocky Mountain National Park